Ambinanisakana is a rural commune in Madagascar. It belongs to the district of Soanierana Ivongo, which is a part of Analanjirofo Region. The population of the commune was estimated to be approximately 26,990 in 2018.

This commune was split off Soanierana Ivongo only in 2015.

The majority 80% of the population of the commune are farmers.  The most important crops are cloves and lychee, while other important agricultural products are coffee, rice and vanilla.  Services provide employment for 15% of the population. Additionally fishing employs 5% of the population.

References 

Populated places in Analanjirofo